Amand Dalem (5 June 1938 – 28 February 2018) was a Belgian politician who was Mayor of Rochefort (1970–1994), Senator (1979–1994), Minister of the Walloon Government (1985–1992), and Governor of the Province of Namur (1994–2007).

References

1938 births
2018 deaths
Governors of Namur (province)
Government ministers of Wallonia
Members of the Parliament of Wallonia
Members of the Senate (Belgium)
Mayors of places in Belgium
People from Rochefort, Belgium